The Carolina League is a Minor League Baseball league which has operated along the Atlantic Coast of the United States since 1945. Having been classified at various levels throughout its existence, it operated at Class A-Advanced from 1990 until its demotion to Single-A following Major League Baseball's 2021 reorganization of the minor leagues. The league temporarily operated for the 2021 season as the Low-A East before reassuming its original moniker in 2022.

The organization that later became the Carolina League formed in 1945, just as World War II was ending, and consisted of eight teams,  six from North Carolina and two from southern Virginia. This later grew to as many as 12 teams at times.

History
The Carolina League was announced on October 29, 1944, after an organizational meeting at Durham, North Carolina. It was a successor to the Class D Bi-State League that existed before World War II. The league began play in 1945 with eight teams based in Burlington, Durham, Greensboro, Leaksville, Raleigh, Winston-Salem (all from North Carolina), along with Danville and Martinsville from Virginia.

A few of the many Carolina League players who have gone on to star in the Major Leagues are: Johnny Bench (Peninsula, 1966), Wade Boggs (Winston-Salem, 1977), Barry Bonds (Prince William, 1985), Rod Carew (Wilson, 1966), Dock Ellis (Kinston, 1965), Dwight Evans (Winston-Salem, 1971), Dwight Gooden (Lynchburg, 1983), Zack Greinke (Wilmington, 2003), Andruw Jones (Durham, 1996), Chipper Jones (Durham, 1992), Willie McCovey (Danville, 1956), Joe Morgan (Durham, 1963), Dave Parker (Salem, 1972), Tony Pérez (Rocky Mount, 1962), Andy Pettitte (Prince William, 1993), Jorge Posada (Prince William, 1993), Darryl Strawberry (Lynchburg, 1981), Bernie Williams (Prince William, 1988), and Carl Yastrzemski (Raleigh, 1959).

Director and screenwriter Ron Shelton's 1988 film Bull Durham, starring Kevin Costner, Tim Robbins, and Susan Sarandon, depicted a fictionalized account of the Durham Bulls, at that time a Carolina League team (they have since become a Class AAA team in the International League). Before he began making films, Shelton had a five-year minor league career in the Baltimore Orioles' organization, which included a stint in the International League.

The Carolina League added two expansion teams for the 2017 season to fill two vacant spots at the Class A-Advanced level previously occupied by the California League's Bakersfield Blaze and High Desert Mavericks, which ceased operations at the end of the 2016 season. These additional teams were the Down East Wood Ducks in Kinston, North Carolina, and the Buies Creek Astros in Buies Creek, North Carolina. After the 2019 season, the Potomac Nationals relocated within Northern Virginia to Fredericksburg, rebranding themselves as the Fredericksburg Nationals.

The start of the 2020 season was postponed due to the COVID-19 pandemic before ultimately being cancelled on June 30. As part of Major League Baseball's 2021 reorganization of the minor leagues, the Carolina League was demoted to Single-A and temporarily renamed the "Low-A East" for the 2021 season. Following MLB's acquisition of the rights to the names of the historical minor leagues, the Low-A East was renamed the Carolina League effective with the 2022 season.

Current teams

Champions

Awards

All-time teams (1945–present)
All teams that have competed in the Carolina League since its founding in 1945:

Alamance Indians (1958–1964, became the Burlington Senators)
Alexandria Dukes (1978, became the Alexandria Mariners)
Alexandria Dukes (1980–1983, became the Prince William Pirates)
Alexandria Mariners (1979, became the Alexandria Dukes)
Asheville Tourists (1967, moved to Southern League)
Augusta GreenJackets (2021–present)
Buies Creek Astros (2017–2018; became the Fayetteville Woodpeckers)
Burlington Bees (1945–1951, became the Burlington-Graham Pirates)
Burlington Rangers (1972, folded)
Burlington Senators (1965–1971, became the Burlington Rangers)
Burlington-Graham Pirates (1952–1955, folded)
Carolina Mudcats (2012–present)
Charleston RiverDogs (2021–present)
Columbia Fireflies (2021–present)
Danville 97s (1998, became the Myrtle Beach Pelicans)
Danville Leafs (1945–1958, folded)
Delmarva Shorebirds (2021–present)
Down East Wood Ducks (2017–present)
Durham Bulls (1945–1967, merged with the Raleigh Pirates and became the Raleigh-Durham Mets)
Durham Bulls (1980–1997, became the Danville 97s)
Fayetteville Athletics (1950–1952, became the Fayetteville Highlanders)
Fayetteville Highlanders (1953–1956, folded)
Fayetteville Woodpeckers (2019–present)
Frederick Keys (1989–2020, moved to MLB Draft League)
Fredericksburg Nationals (2020–present)
Greensboro Patriots (1945–1957, became the Greensboro Yankees)
Greensboro Patriots (1968, folded)
Greensboro Yankees (1958–1967, became the Greensboro Patriots)
Hagerstown Suns (1981–1988, became the Frederick Keys)
High Point-Thomasville Hi-Toms (1954–1958, folded)
High Point-Thomasville Hi-Toms (1968, became the High Point-Thomasville Royals)
High Point-Thomasville Royals (1969, folded)
Kannapolis Cannon Ballers (2021–present)
Kinston Blue Jays (1982–1985, became the Kinston Eagles)
Kinston Eagles (1956–1957, merged with the Wilson Tobs)
Kinston Eagles (1962–1973, became the Kinston Expos)
Kinston Eagles (1978–1981, became the Kinston Blue Jays)
Kinston Eagles (1986, became the Kinston Indians)
Kinston Expos (1974, folded)
Kinston Indians (1987–2011, became the Carolina Mudcats)
Leaksville-Draper-Spray Triplets (1945–1947, moved to the Blue Ridge League)
Lynchburg Hillcats (1995–present)
Lynchburg Mets (1976–1987, became the Lynchburg Red Sox)
Lynchburg Rangers (1975, became the Lynchburg Mets)
Lynchburg Red Sox (1988–1994, became the Lynchburg Hillcats)
Lynchburg Twins (1970–1974, became the Lynchburg Rangers)
Lynchburg White Sox (1966–1969, became the Lynchburg Twins)
Martinsville Athletics (1945–1949, folded)
Myrtle Beach Pelicans (1999–present)

Peninsula Astros (1969–1970, became the Peninsula Phillies)
Peninsula Grays (1964–1968, became the Peninsula Astros)
Peninsula Pennants (1974, folded)
Peninsula Phillies (1971, folded)
Peninsula Pilots (1976–1985, became the Peninsula White Sox)
Peninsula Pilots (1989–1992, became the Wilmington Blue Rocks)
Peninsula Senators (1963, became the Peninsula Grays)
Peninsula White Sox (1986–1987, became the Virginia Generals)
Potomac Cannons (1999–2004, became the Potomac Nationals)
Potomac Nationals (2005–2019, became the Fredericksburg Nationals)
Prince William Cannons (1990–1998, became the Potomac Cannons)
Prince William Pirates (1984–1986, became the Prince William Yankees)
Prince William Yankees (1987–1989, became the Prince William Cannons)
Raleigh Capitals (1957–1962, became the Raleigh Mets)
Raleigh Capitals (1945–1953, folded)
Raleigh Cardinals (1964–1965, became the Raleigh Pirates)
Raleigh Mets (1963, became the Raleigh Cardinals)
Raleigh Pirates (1966–1967, merged with the Durham Bulls and became the Raleigh-Durham Mets)
Raleigh-Durham Mets (1968, became the Raleigh-Durham Phillies)
Raleigh-Durham Phillies (1969, became the Raleigh-Durham Triangles)
Raleigh-Durham Triangles (1970–1971, folded)
Red Springs Twins (1969, folded)
Reidsville Luckies (1948–1954, became the Reidsville Phillies)
Reidsville Phillies (1955, folded)
Rocky Mount Leafs (1962–1963, became the Rocky Mount Senators)
Rocky Mount Leafs (1965–1972, became the Rocky Mount Phillies)
Rocky Mount Phillies (1973–1975, folded)
Rocky Mount Pines (1980, became the Hagerstown Suns)
Rocky Mount Senators (1964, became the Rocky Mount Leafs)
Salem Avalanche (1995–2008, became the Salem Red Sox)
Salem Buccaneers (1987–1994, became the Salem Avalanche)
Salem Pirates (1972–1979, became the Salem Redbirds)
Salem Rebels (1968–1971, became the Salem Pirates)
Salem Red Sox (2009–present)
Salem Redbirds (1980–1986, became the Salem Buccaneers)
Tidewater Tides (1963–1968, moved to the International League)
Virginia Generals (1988, became the Peninsula Pilots)
Wilmington Blue Rocks (1993–2020, moved to High-A East)
Wilson Pennants (1973, folded)
Wilson Tobs (1956–1968, folded)
Winston-Salem Cardinals (1945–1953, became the Winston-Salem Twins)
Winston-Salem Dash (2009–2020, moved to High-A East)
Winston-Salem Red Birds (1957–1960, became the Winston-Salem Red Sox)
Winston-Salem Red Sox (1961–1983, became the Winston-Salem Spirits)
Winston-Salem Spirits (1984–1994, became the Winston-Salem Warthogs)
Winston-Salem Twins (1954–1956, became the Winston-Salem Red Birds)
Winston-Salem Warthogs (1995–2008, became the Winston-Salem Dash)

League timeline (1945–2020)

Notes

References

External links

 
Minor baseball leagues in the United States
Baseball leagues in North Carolina
Sports leagues established in 1945
1945 establishments in North Carolina
Professional sports leagues in the United States